Palafoxia arida is a species of flowering plant in the aster family, known by the common names desert palafox and Spanish needle.

Distribution
It is native to the Mojave Desert and Sonoran Desert ecoregions of California, the Southwestern United States, and northwestern Mexico.

Description
Palafoxia arida is an annual herb producing an erect, branching, glandular stem.  The rough-haired leaves are linear or lance-shaped and may exceed 10 centimeters long.

The inflorescence is an array of up to 40 flower heads. The cylindrical heads are about 2 to 3 centimeters long, lined with long, pointed phyllaries, and bearing up to 40 pink or white tubular disc florets.

The fruit is an achene over a centimeter long including the pappus.

Varieties
There are two varieties:
Palafoxia arida var. arida — desert needle,  desert palafox.
Palafoxia arida var. gigantea — giant Spanish needle; the larger, reaching  in maximum height.

References

External links
Calflora Database: Palafoxia arida (Desert palafox,  Spanish needle)
Jepson Manual eFlora (TJM2) treatment of Palafoxia arida
USDA Plants Profile for Palafoxia arida (desert palafox)
U.C. Photos gallery

arida
Flora of the California desert regions
Flora of the Sonoran Deserts
Flora of Northwestern Mexico
Flora of the Southwestern United States
Natural history of the Colorado Desert
Natural history of the Mojave Desert
Flora without expected TNC conservation status